Genuri is a comune (municipality) in the Province of South Sardinia in the Italian region Sardinia, located about  northwest of Cagliari and about  north of Sanluri.

Genuri borders the following municipalities: Baradili, Genoni, Setzu, Sini, Turri.

Demographic evolution

References

Cities and towns in Sardinia